The 177th Airlift Squadron (177 AS) is a unit of the 119th Wing of the North Dakota Air National Guard, stationed at Fargo Air National Guard Base, North Dakota. The 177th is equipped with the C-21A Learjet.

Overview
The 177th Airlift Squadron accomplishes several missions including operational support airlift, transportation of distinguished visitors, and a responsive aeromedical airlift system to move eligible patients.

History
The squadron was authorized in 2008 and activated at Fargo Air National Guard Base when the 178th Airlift Squadron of the 119th Airlift Wing was equipped with MQ-1 Predator unmanned aerial vehicles.   The 178th was redesignated the 178th Reconnaissance Squadron and the C-21A Learjets it formerly operated being were transferred to the new 177th Airlift Squadron.   Support equipment and personnel from the 178th were also reassigned to the 177th.

In 2009, the 177th deployed to Iraq in support of Operation Iraqi Freedom.  It was the first deployment into a combat zone for a unit of the North Dakota Air National Guard.  The squadron transported more than 400 service members during their two-month-long rotation in theater. They accomplished this by flying more than 200 sorties during 90 missions as part of the 379th Expeditionary Operations Group.

Lineage
 Designated 177th Airlift Squadron, and allotted to North Dakota ANG, 2008
 Extended federal recognition and activated, 1 March 2008

Assignments
 119th Operations Group, 1 March 2008 – present

Stations
 Fargo Air National Guard Base, North Dakota, 1 March 2008 – present

Aircraft
 C-21A Learjet, 2008–Present

References

External links
 119th Wing Factsheet
 Happy Hooligans complete final sortie in Iraq.

Squadrons of the United States Air National Guard
176
Military units and formations in North Dakota